The human penis is an external male intromittent organ that additionally serves as the urinary duct. The main parts are the root (radix); the body (corpus); and the epithelium of the penis including the shaft skin and the foreskin (prepuce) covering the glans penis. The body of the penis is made up of three columns of tissue: two corpora cavernosa on the dorsal side and corpus spongiosum between them on the ventral side. The human male urethra passes through the prostate gland, where it is joined by the ejaculatory duct, and then through the penis. The urethra traverses the corpus spongiosum, and its opening, the meatus, lies on the tip of the glans penis. It is a passage both for urination and ejaculation of semen (see male reproductive system.)

Most of the penis develops from the same embryonic tissue as the clitoris in females. The skin around the penis and the urethra share the same embryonic origin as the labia minora in females. An erection is the stiffening expansion and orthogonal reorientation of the penis, which occurs during sexual arousal. Erections can occur in non-sexual situations; spontaneous non-sexual erections frequently occur during adolescence and sleep. In its flaccid state the penis is smaller, gives to pressure, and the glans is covered by the foreskin. In its fully erect state, the corpus becomes rigid and the glans becomes engorged but not rigid. An erect penis may be straight or curved and may point at an upward angle, a downward angle, or straight ahead. Neither age nor size of the flaccid penis accurately predicts erectile length.

There are several common body modifications to the penis, including circumcision and piercings.

Anatomy

Parts
 Root of the penis (radix): It is the attached part, consisting of the bulb of penis in the middle and the crus of penis, one on either side of the bulb. It lies within the superficial perineal pouch. The crus of penis is attached to the pubic arch.
 Body of the penis (corpus): The pendulous part of the penis. It has two surfaces: dorsal (posterosuperior in the erect penis), and ventral or urethral (facing downwards and backwards in the flaccid penis). The ventral surface is marked by the penile raphe. The base of the body of penis is supported by the suspensory ligament which is attached to the pubic symphysis.
 Epithelium of the penis consists of the shaft skin, the foreskin, and the preputial mucosa on the inside of the foreskin and covering the glans penis. The epithelium is not attached to the underlying shaft so it is free to glide to and fro.

Structure
The human penis is made up of three columns of tissue: two corpora cavernosa lie next to each other on the dorsal side and one corpus spongiosum lies between them on the ventral side.
The corpus cavernosum forms most of the penis and contains blood vessels that fill with blood to help make an erection.

The crus of penis is the proximal parts of the corpora cavernosum. The corpus spongiosum is an erectile tissue surrounding the urethra. The proximal parts of the corpus spongiosum form the bulb of penis and the distal ends form the glans penis.

The enlarged and bulbous-shaped end of the corpus spongiosum forms the glans penis with two specific types of sinusoids, which supports the foreskin, or prepuce, a loose fold of skin that in adults can retract to expose the glans. The area on the underside of the penis, where the foreskin is attached, is called the frenum, or frenulum. The rounded base of the glans is called the corona. The perineal raphe is the noticeable line along the underside of the penis.

The urethra, which is the last part of the urinary tract, traverses the corpus spongiosum, and its opening, known as the meatus , lies on the tip of the glans penis. It is a passage both for urine and for the ejaculation of semen. Sperm are produced in the testes and stored in the attached epididymis. During ejaculation, sperm are propelled up the vas deferens, two ducts that pass over and behind the bladder. Fluids are added by the seminal vesicles and the vas deferens turns into the ejaculatory ducts, which join the urethra inside the prostate gland. The prostate as well as the bulbourethral glands add further secretions, and the semen is expelled through the penis.

The raphe is the visible ridge between the lateral halves of the penis, found on the ventral or underside of the penis, running from the meatus (opening of the urethra) across the scrotum to the perineum (area between scrotum and anus).

The human penis differs from those of most other mammals, as it has no baculum (or erectile bone) and instead relies entirely on engorgement with blood to reach its erect state. A distal ligament buttresses the glans penis and plays an integral role to the penile fibroskeleton, and the structure is called "os analog," a term coined by Geng Long Hsu in the Encyclopedia of Reproduction. It is a remnant of baculum evolved likely due to change in mating practice.

The human penis cannot be withdrawn into the groin, and it is larger than average in the animal kingdom in proportion to body mass. The human penis is reciprocating from a cotton soft to a bony rigidity resulting from penile arterial flow varied between 2–3 to 60-80 mL/Min implies the most ideal milieu to apply Pascal's law in the entire human body; the overall structure is unique.

Size

Penile measurements vary, with studies that rely on self-measurement reporting a significantly higher average size than those which rely on measurements taken by health professional. A 2015 systematic review of 15,521 men in which the subjects were measured by health professionals concluded that the average length of an erect human penis is 13.12 cm (5.17 inches) long, while the average circumference of an erect human penis is 11.66 cm (4.59 inches).

Among all primates, the human penis is the largest in girth, but is comparable to the chimpanzee penis and the penises of certain other primates in length. Penis size is affected by genetics, but also by environmental factors such as fertility medications and chemical/pollution exposure. The longest officially documented human penis was found by physician Robert Latou Dickinson.

Normal variations

Pearly penile papules are raised bumps of somewhat paler color around the base (sulcus) of the glans which typically develop in men aged 20 to 40. As of 1999, different studies had produced estimates of incidence ranging from 8 to 48 percent of all men. They may be mistaken for warts, but are not harmful or infectious and do not require treatment.
Fordyce's spots are small, raised, yellowish-white spots 1–2 mm in diameter that may appear on the penis, which again are common and not infectious.
Sebaceous prominences are raised bumps similar to Fordyce's spots on the shaft of the penis, located at the sebaceous glands and are normal.
Phimosis is an inability to retract the foreskin fully. It is normal and harmless in infancy and pre-pubescence, occurring in about 8% of boys at age 10. According to the British Medical Association, treatment (topical steroid cream and/or manual stretching) does not need to be considered until age 19.
Curvature: few penises are completely straight, with curves commonly seen in all directions (up, down, left, right). Sometimes the curve is very prominent but it rarely inhibits sexual intercourse. Curvature as great as 30° is considered normal and medical treatment is rarely considered unless the angle exceeds 45°. Changes to the curvature of a penis may be caused by Peyronie's disease.

Development

Differences between female and male organs

In the developing fetus, the genital tubercle develops into the glans of the penis in males and into the clitoral glans in females; they are homologous. The urogenital fold develops into the skin around the shaft of the penis and the urethra in males and into the labia minora in females. The corpora cavernosa are homologous to the body of the clitoris; the corpus spongiosum is homologous to the vestibular bulbs beneath the labia minora; the scrotum, homologous to the labia majora; and the foreskin, homologous to the clitoral hood. The raphe does not exist in females, because there, the two halves are not connected.

Growth in puberty

On entering puberty, the penis, scrotum and testicles will enlarge toward maturity. During the process, pubic hair grows above and around the penis. A large-scale study assessing penis size in thousands of 17- to 19-year-old males found no difference in average penis size between 17-year-olds and 19-year-olds. From this, it can be concluded that penile growth is typically complete not later than age 17, and possibly earlier.

Physiological functions

Urination

In males the expulsion of urine from the body is done through the penis. The urethra drains the bladder through the prostate gland where it is joined by the ejaculatory duct, and then onward to the penis. At the root of the penis (the proximal end of the corpus spongiosum) lies the external sphincter muscle. This is a small sphincter of striated muscle tissue and is in healthy males under voluntary control. Relaxing the urethra sphincter allows the urine in the upper urethra to enter the penis properly and thus empty the urinary bladder.

Physiologically, urination involves coordination between the central, autonomic, and somatic nervous systems. In infants, some elderly individuals, and those with neurological injury, urination may occur as an involuntary reflex. Brain centers that regulate urination include the pontine micturition center, periaqueductal gray, and the cerebral cortex. During erection, these centers block the relaxation of the sphincter muscles, so as to act as a physiological separation of the excretory and reproductive function of the penis, and preventing urine from entering the upper portion of the urethra during ejaculation.

Voiding position
The distal section of the urethra allows a human male to direct the stream of urine by holding the penis. This flexibility allows the male to choose the posture in which to urinate. In cultures where more than a minimum of clothing is worn, the penis allows the male to urinate while standing without removing much of the clothing. It is customary for some boys and men to urinate in seated or crouched positions. The preferred position may be influenced by cultural or religious beliefs. Research on the medical superiority of either position exists, but the data are heterogenic. A meta-analysis summarizing the evidence found no superior position for young, healthy males. For elderly males with LUTS, however, the sitting position when compared to the standing position is differentiated by the following:
 the post void residual volume (PVR, ml) was significantly decreased 
 the maximum urinary flow (Qmax, ml/s) was increased
 the voiding time (VT, s) was decreased
This urodynamic profile is related to a lower risk of urologic complications, such as cystitis and bladder stones.

Erection

An erection is the stiffening and rising of the penis, which occurs during sexual arousal, though it can also happen in non-sexual situations. Spontaneous erections frequently occur during adolescence due to friction with clothing, a full bladder or large intestine, hormone fluctuations, nervousness, and undressing in a nonsexual situation. It is also normal for erections to occur during sleep and upon waking. (See nocturnal penile tumescence.) The primary physiological mechanism that brings about erection is the autonomic dilation of arteries supplying blood to the penis, which allows more blood to fill the three spongy erectile tissue chambers in the penis, causing it to lengthen and stiffen. The now-engorged erectile tissue presses against and constricts the veins that carry blood away from the penis. More blood enters than leaves the penis until an equilibrium is reached where an equal volume of blood flows into the dilated arteries and out of the constricted veins; a constant erectile size is achieved at this equilibrium. The scrotum will usually tighten during erection.

Erection facilitates sexual intercourse though it is not essential for various other sexual activities.

Erection angle
Although many erect penises point upwards (see illustration), it is common and normal for the erect penis to point nearly vertically upwards or nearly vertically downwards or even horizontally straight forward, all depending on the tension of the suspensory ligament that holds it in position.

The following table shows how common various erection angles are for a standing male, out of a sample of 81 males aged 21 through 67. In the table, zero degrees is pointing straight up against the abdomen, 90 degrees is horizontal and pointing straight forward, while 180 degrees would be pointing straight down to the feet. An upward pointing angle is most common.

Ejaculation

Ejaculation is the ejection of semen from the penis. It is usually accompanied by orgasm. A series of muscular contractions delivers semen, containing male gametes known as sperm cells or spermatozoa, from the penis. Ejaculation usually happens as the result of sexual stimulation, but it can be due to prostatic disease in rare cases. Ejaculation may occur spontaneously during sleep (known as a nocturnal emission or wet dream). Anejaculation is the condition of being unable to ejaculate.

Ejaculation has two phases: emission and ejaculation proper. The emission phase of the ejaculatory reflex is under control of the sympathetic nervous system, while the ejaculatory phase is under control of a spinal reflex at the level of the spinal nerves S2–4 via the pudendal nerve. A refractory period succeeds the ejaculation, and sexual stimulation precedes it.

Evolved adaptations 
The human penis has been argued to have several evolutionary adaptations. The purpose of these adaptations is to maximise reproductive success and minimise sperm competition. Sperm competition is where the sperm of two males simultaneously resides within the reproductive tract of a female and they compete to fertilise the egg. If sperm competition results in the rival male's sperm fertilising the egg, cuckoldry could occur. This is the process whereby males unwittingly invest their resources into offspring of another male and, evolutionarily speaking, should be avoided.

The most researched human penis adaptations are testis and penis size, ejaculate adjustment and semen displacement.

Testis and penis size 
Evolution has caused sexually selected adaptations to occur in penis and testis size in order to maximise reproductive success and minimise sperm competition.

Sperm competition has caused the human penis to evolve in length and size for sperm retention and displacement. To achieve this, the penis must be of sufficient length to reach any rival sperm and to maximally fill the vagina. In order to ensure that the female retains the male's sperm, the adaptations in length of the human penis have occurred so that the ejaculate is placed close to the female cervix. This is achieved when complete penetration occurs and the penis pushes against the cervix. These adaptations have occurred in order to release and retain sperm to the highest point of the vaginal tract. As a result, this adaptation also leaves the sperm less vulnerable to sperm displacement and semen loss. Another reason for this adaptation is that, due to the nature of the human posture, gravity creates vulnerability for semen loss. Therefore, a long penis, which places the ejaculate deep in the vaginal tract, could reduce the loss of semen.

Another evolutionary theory of penis size is female mate choice and its associations with social judgements in modern-day society. A study which illustrates female mate choice as an influence on penis size presented females with life-size, rotatable, computer generated males. These varied in height, body shape and flaccid penis size, with these aspects being examples of masculinity. Female ratings of attractiveness for each male revealed that larger penises were associated with higher attractiveness ratings. These relations between penis size and attractiveness have therefore led to frequently emphasized associations between masculinity and penis size in popular media. This has led to a social bias existing around penis size with larger penises being preferred and having higher social status. This is reflected in the association between believed sexual prowess and penis size and the social judgement of penis size in relation to 'manhood'.

Like the penis, sperm competition has caused the human testicles to evolve in size through sexual selection. This means that large testicles are an example of a sexually selected adaptation. The human testicles are moderately sized when compared to other animals such as gorillas and chimpanzees, placing somewhere midway. Large testicles are advantageous in sperm competition due to their ability to produce a bigger ejaculation. Research has shown that a positive correlation exists between the number of sperm ejaculated and testis size. Larger testes have also been shown to predict higher sperm quality, including a larger number of motile sperm and higher sperm motility.

Research has also demonstrated that evolutionary adaptations of testis size are dependent on the breeding system in which the species resides. Single-male breeding systems—or monogamous societies—tend to show smaller testis size than do multi-male breeding systems or extra-pair copulation (EPC) societies. Human males live largely in monogamous societies like gorillas, and therefore testis size is smaller in comparison to primates in multi-male breeding systems, such as chimpanzees. The reason for the differentiation in testis size is that in order to succeed reproductively in a multi-male breeding system, males must possess the ability to produce several fully fertilising ejaculations one after another. This, however, is not the case in monogamous societies, where a reduction in fertilising ejaculations has no effect on reproductive success. This is reflected in humans, as the sperm count in ejaculations is decreased if copulation occurs more than three to five times in a week.

Ejaculate adjustment 
One of the primary ways in which a male's ejaculate has evolved to overcome sperm competition is through the speed at which it travels. Ejaculates can travel up to 30–60 centimetres at a time which, when combined with its placement at the highest point of the vaginal tract, acts to increase a male's chances that an egg will be fertilised by his sperm (as opposed to a potential rival male's sperm), thus maximising his paternal certainty.

In addition, males can—and do—adjust their ejaculates in response to sperm competition and according to the likely cost-benefits of mating with a particular female. Research has focused primarily on two fundamental ways in which males go about achieving this: adjusting ejaculate size and adjusting ejaculate quality.

Size 
The number of sperm in any given ejaculate varies from one ejaculate to another. This variation is hypothesised to be a male's attempt to eliminate, if not reduce, his sperm competition. A male will alter the number of sperm he inseminates into a female according to his perceived level of sperm competition, inseminating a higher number of sperm if he suspects a greater level of competition from other males.

In support of ejaculate adjustment, research has shown that a male typically increases the amount he inseminates sperm into his partner after they have been separated for a period of time. This is largely due to the fact that the less time a couple is able to spend together, the chances the female will be inseminated by another male increases, hence greater sperm competition. Increasing the number of sperm a male inseminates into a female acts to get rid of any rival male's sperm that may be stored within the female, as a result of her potential extra-pair copulations (EPCs) during this separation. Through increasing the amount he inseminates his partner following separation, a male increases his chances of paternal certainty. This increase in the number of sperm a male produces in response to sperm competition is not observed for masturbatory ejaculates.

Quality 
Males also adjust their ejaculates in response to sperm competition in terms of quality. Research has demonstrated, for example, that simply viewing a sexually explicit image of a female and two males (i.e. high sperm competition) can cause males to produce a greater amount of motile sperm than when viewing a sexually explicit image depicting exclusively three females (i.e. low sperm competition). Much like increasing the number, increasing the quality of sperm that a male inseminates into a female enhances his paternal certainty when the threat of sperm competition is high.

Female phenotypic quality 
A female's phenotypic quality is a key determinant of a male's ejaculate investment. Research has shown that males produce larger ejaculates containing better, more motile sperm when mating with a higher quality female. This is largely to reduce a male's sperm competition, since more attractive females are likely to be approached and subsequently inseminated by more males than are less attractive females. Increasing investment in females with high quality phenotypic traits therefore acts to offset the ejaculate investment of others. In addition, female attractiveness has been shown to be an indicator of reproductive quality, with greater value in higher quality females. It is therefore beneficial for males to increase their ejaculate size and quality when mating with more attractive females, since this is likely to maximise their reproductive success also. Through assessing a female's phenotypic quality, males can judge whether or not to invest (or invest more) in a particular female, which will influence their subsequent ejaculate adjustment.

Semen displacement 
The shape of the human penis is thought to have evolved as a result of sperm competition. Semen displacement is an adaptation of the shape of the penis to draw foreign semen away from the cervix. This means that in the event of a rival male's sperm residing within the reproductive tract of a female, the human penis is able to displace the rival sperm, replacing it with his own.

Semen displacement has two main benefits for a male. Firstly, by displacing a rival male's sperm, the risk of the rival sperm fertilising the egg is reduced, thus minimising the risk of sperm competition. Secondly, the male replaces the rival's sperm with his own, therefore increasing his own chance of fertilising the egg and successfully reproducing with the female. However, males have to ensure they do not displace their own sperm. It is thought that the relatively quick loss of erection after ejaculation, penile hypersensitivity following ejaculation, and the shallower, slower thrusting of the male after ejaculation, prevents this from occurring.

The coronal ridge is the part of the human penis thought to have evolved to allow for semen displacement. Research has studied how much semen is displaced by differently shaped artificial genitals. This research showed that, when combined with thrusting, the coronal ridge of the penis is able to remove the seminal fluid of a rival male from within the female reproductive tract. It does this by forcing the semen under the frenulum of the coronal ridge, causing it to collect behind the coronal ridge shaft. When model penises without a coronal ridge were used, less than half the artificial sperm was displaced, compared to penises with a coronal ridge.

The presence of a coronal ridge alone, however, is not sufficient for effective semen displacement. It must be combined with adequate thrusting to be successful. It has been shown that the deeper the thrusting, the larger the semen displacement. No semen displacement occurs with shallow thrusting. Some have therefore termed thrusting as a semen displacement behaviour.

The behaviours associated with semen displacement, namely thrusting (number of thrusts and depth of thrusts), and duration of sexual intercourse, have been shown to vary according to whether a male perceives the risk of partner infidelity to be high or not. Males and females report greater semen displacement behaviours following allegations of infidelity. In particular, following allegations of infidelity, males and females report deeper and quicker thrusting during sexual intercourse.

Circumcision has been suggested to affect semen displacement. Circumcision causes the coronal ridge to be more pronounced, and it has been hypothesised that this could enhance semen displacement. This is supported by females' reports of sexual intercourse with circumcised males. Females report that their vaginal secretions diminish as intercourse with a circumcised male progresses, and that circumcised males thrust more deeply. It has therefore been suggested that the more pronounced coronal ridge, combined with the deeper thrusting, causes the vaginal secretions of the female to be displaced in the same way as rival sperm can be.

Clinical significance

Disorders
Paraphimosis is an inability to move the foreskin forward over the glans. It can result from fluid trapped in a foreskin left retracted, perhaps following a medical procedure, or accumulation of fluid in the foreskin because of friction during vigorous sexual activity.
In Peyronie's disease, anomalous scar tissue grows in the soft tissue of the penis, causing curvature. Severe cases can be improved by surgical correction.
A thrombosis can occur during periods of frequent and prolonged sexual activity, especially fellatio. It is usually harmless and self-corrects within a few weeks.
Infection with the herpes virus can occur after sexual contact with an infected carrier; this may lead to the development of herpes sores.
Balanitis is an inflammation, either infectious or not.
Pudendal nerve entrapment is a condition characterized by pain on sitting and the loss of penile sensation and orgasm. Occasionally there is a total loss of sensation and orgasm. The pudendal nerve can be damaged by narrow, hard bicycle seats and accidents. This can also occur in the clitoris of females.
Penile fracture can occur if the erect penis is bent excessively. A popping or cracking sound and pain is normally associated with this event. Emergency medical assistance should be obtained as soon as possible. Prompt medical attention lowers the likelihood of permanent penile curvature.
In diabetes, peripheral neuropathy can cause tingling in the penile skin and possibly reduced or completely absent sensation. The reduced sensations can lead to injuries for either partner and their absence can make it impossible to have sexual pleasure through stimulation of the penis. Since the problems are caused by permanent nerve damage, preventive treatment through good control of the diabetes is the primary treatment. Some limited recovery may be possible through improved diabetes control.
Erectile dysfunction is the inability to develop and maintain an erection sufficiently firm for satisfactory sexual performance. Diabetes is a leading cause, as is natural aging. A variety of treatments exist, most notably including the phosphodiesterase type 5 inhibitor drugs (such as sildenafil citrate, marketed as Viagra), which work by vasodilation.
Priapism is a painful and potentially harmful medical condition in which the erect penis does not return to its flaccid state. Priapism lasting over four hours is a medical emergency. The causative mechanisms are poorly understood but involve complex neurological and vascular factors. Potential complications include ischaemia, thrombosis, and impotence. In serious cases the condition may result in gangrene, which may result in amputation. However, that is usually only the case if the organ is broke out and injured because of it. The condition has been associated with a variety of drugs including prostaglandin. Contrary to common knowledge, sildenafil (Viagra) will not cause it.
Lymphangiosclerosis is a hardened lymph vessel, although it can feel like a hardened, almost calcified or fibrous, vein. It tends not to share the common blue tint with a vein however. It can be felt as a hardened lump or "vein" even when the penis is flaccid, and is even more prominent during an erection. It is considered a benign physical condition. It is fairly common and can follow a particularly vigorous sexual activity for men, and tends to go away if given rest and more gentle care, for example by use of lubricants.
Carcinoma of the penis is rare with a reported rate of 1 person in 100,000 in developed countries. Some sources state that circumcision can protect against this disease, but this notion remains controversial among medical circles.

Developmental disorders
Hypospadias is a developmental disorder where the meatus is positioned wrongly at birth. Hypospadias can also occur iatrogenically by the downward pressure of an indwelling urethral catheter. It is usually corrected by surgery.
A micropenis is a very small penis caused by developmental or congenital problems.
Diphallia, or penile duplication (PD), is the rare condition of having two penises.

Alleged and observed psychological disorders
Penis panic (koro in Malaysian/Indonesian) — delusion of shrinkage of the penis and retraction into the body. This appears to be culturally conditioned and largely limited to Ghana, Sudan, China, Japan, Southeast Asia, and West Africa.
 In April 2008, Kinshasa, Democratic Republic of Congo, West Africa's 'Police arrested 14 suspected victims (of penis snatching) and sorcerers accused of using black magic or witchcraft to steal (make disappear) or shrink men's penises to extort cash for cure, amid a wave of panic. Arrests were made in an effort to avoid bloodshed seen in Ghana a decade before, when 12 penis snatchers were beaten to death by mobs.
Penis envy — the contested Freudian belief of all women inherently envying men for having penises.

Society and culture

Terminology
In many cultures, referring to the penis is considered taboo or vulgar, and a variety of slang words and euphemisms are used to talk about it. In English, these include member, dick, cock, prick, johnson, dork, peter, pecker, manhood, stick, rod, thing, third/middle leg, dong, willy, schlong, and todger. Many of these are used as insults—though sometimes playfully—meaning an unpleasant or unworthy person. Among these, historically, most commonly used euphemism for penis in English literature and society was member.

Alteration

The penis is sometimes pierced or decorated by other body art. Other than circumcision, genital alterations are almost universally elective and usually for the purpose of aesthetics or increased sensitivity. Piercings of the penis include the Prince Albert, the apadravya, the ampallang, the dydoe, and the frenum piercing. Foreskin restoration or stretching is a further form of body modification, as well as implants under the shaft of the penis.

Trans women who undergo sex reassignment surgery have their penis surgically modified into a vagina via vaginoplasty. Trans men who undergo such surgery have a phalloplasty.

Other practices that alter the penis are also performed, although they are rare in Western societies without a diagnosed medical condition. Apart from penectomy, perhaps the most radical of these is subincision, in which the urethra is split along the underside of the penis. Subincision originated among Australian Aborigines, although it is now done by some in the U.S. and Europe.

Circumcision

The most common form of body modification related to the penis is circumcision: removal of part or all of the foreskin. It is most commonly performed as an elective procedure for prophylactic, cultural, or religious reasons. For infant circumcision, modern devices such as the Gomco clamp, Plastibell, and Mogen clamp are available.

With all modern devices the same basic procedure is followed. First, the amount of foreskin to be removed is estimated. The foreskin is then opened via the preputial orifice to reveal the glans underneath and ensured that it is normal. The inner lining of the foreskin (preputial epithelium) is then separated from its attachment to the glans. The device is then placed (this sometimes requires a dorsal slit) and remains there until blood flow has stopped. Finally, part, or all, of the foreskin is then removed. Adult circumcisions are often performed without clamps and require 4 to 6 weeks of abstinence from masturbation or intercourse after the operation to allow the wound to heal. In some African countries, male circumcision is often performed by non-medical personnel under non-sterile conditions. After hospital circumcision, the foreskin may be used in biomedical research, consumer skin-care products, skin grafts, or β-interferon-based drugs. In parts of Africa, the foreskin may be dipped in brandy and eaten by the patient, eaten by the circumciser, or fed to animals. According to Jewish law, after a Brit milah, the foreskin should be buried. Circumcision plays a major role in many of the world's cultures and religions. When performed for religious reasons, it is most common among both Jews and Muslims, among whom it is near-universal.

There are variant cultural, social, ethical, and religious views on circumcision. Among the world's major medical organizations, there is an overwhelming consensus that circumcision reduces heterosexual HIV infection rates in high-risk populations, and differing perspectives on the prophylactic efficacy and cost effectiveness of circumcision in developed nations. The World Health Organization (WHO; 2007), the Joint United Nations Programme on HIV/AIDS (UNAIDS; 2007), and the Centers for Disease Control and Prevention (CDC; 2008) state that evidence indicates circumcision significantly reduces the risk of HIV acquisition by men during penile-vaginal sex, but also state that circumcision only provides partial protection and should not replace other interventions to prevent transmission of HIV.

In 2010, the World Health Organization released a statement encouraging a higher rate of circumcision:There are significant benefits in performing male circumcision in early infancy, and programmes that promote early infant male circumcision are likely to have lower morbidity rates and lower costs than programmes targeting adolescent boys and men.Bolnick, Koyle & Yosha (2012) projects that worldwide circumcision rates will significantly rise "in the first half of the twenty-first century".

Potential regeneration 
There are efforts by scientists to partially or fully regenerate the structures of the human penis. Patients who can benefit most from this field are those who have congenital defects, cancer, and injuries that have excised parts of their genitalia. Some organizations which perform research into, or conduct regeneration procedures, include the Wake Forest Institute for Regenerative Medicine and the United States Department of Defense. The first successful penis allotransplant surgery was done in September 2005 in a military hospital in Guangzhou, China. A man at 44 sustained an injury after an accident and his penis was severed; urination became difficult as his urethra was partly blocked. A recently brain-dead man, aged 23, was selected for the transplant. Despite atrophy of blood vessels and nerves, the arteries, veins, nerves and the corpora spongiosa were successfully matched. But, on 19 September (after two weeks), the surgery was reversed because of a severe psychological problem (rejection) by the recipient and his wife. In 2009 researchers Chen, Eberli, Yoo and Atala have produced bioengineered penises and implanted them on rabbits. The animals were able to obtain erection and copulate, with 10 of 12 rabbits achieving ejaculation. This study shows that in the future it could be possible to produce artificial penises for replacement surgeries or phalloplasties. In 2015 the world's first successful penis transplant took place in Cape Town, South Africa in a nine-hour operation performed by surgeons from Stellenbosch University and Tygerberg Hospital. The 21-year-old recipient, who had been sexually active, had lost his penis in a botched circumcision at 18.

Additional images

References

External links

 Kinsey Institute on the penis

 
Human anatomy
Men's health
Urinary system